Amorphonostoc is a genus of cyanobacteria belonging to the family Nostocaceae.

The genus was first described by Alexander Elenkin in 1937.

Species:
 Amorphonostoc paludosum (Kützing ex Bornet & Flahault) Elenkin
 Amorphonostoc punctiforme (Hariot) Elenkin
 Amorphonostoc punctiforme (Kützing) Elenkin

References

Nostocaceae
Cyanobacteria genera